Peter Eržen (born 13 December 1941) is a Slovenian ski jumper. He competed at the 1964 Winter Olympics and the 1968 Winter Olympics.

References

1941 births
Living people
Slovenian male ski jumpers
Olympic ski jumpers of Yugoslavia
Ski jumpers at the 1964 Winter Olympics
Ski jumpers at the 1968 Winter Olympics
Sportspeople from Kranj